Yazdegerd, Yazdgerd, Yazdigird, or Yazdagird (Inscriptional  <yzdkrty> or  <yzdklty> Yazdgird, Yazdkirt;  Yazdgerd;  Yazdijird) may refer to:

Yazdegerd I (r. 399–420), Sasanian King of Persia
Yazdegerd II (r. 438–457), Sasanian King, son of Bahram V
Yazdegerd III (r. 632–651), last king of the Sasanian Empire
Yazdagird (Bavandid ruler) (r. 1271–1300), ruler in Mazandaran
Yazdgerd, Lorestan, a village in Lorestan Province, Iran

See also
 Yazata, also sometimes spelled Yazad